TV Nova was a television channel in North Macedonia that started to operate on February 1, 2016. The channel was stationed in Skopje and the chief editor of the news was Biljana Vasileva Trendafilova. The television station ended its operations on February 13, 2018.

The station is considered to have been biased against the political foes of former Prime Minister Nikola Gruevski and the VMRO-DPMNE party and to be close to businessmen allied with Hungarian Prime Minister Viktor Orbán, similar to Alfa TV.

See also

 Television in North Macedonia

References

Television channels in North Macedonia